Nitidula rufipes is a species of sap-feeding beetle in the family Nitidulidae. It is found in Europe and Northern Asia (excluding China) and North America.

References

Further reading

External links

 

Nitidulidae
Articles created by Qbugbot
Beetles described in 1767
Taxa named by Carl Linnaeus